Blood and Wine is a 1996 American neo-noir crime thriller film directed by Bob Rafelson and starring Jack Nicholson, Stephen Dorff, Jennifer Lopez, Judy Davis, and Michael Caine. The screenplay was written by Nick Villiers and Alison Cross. Rafelson has stated that the film forms the final part of his unofficial trilogy with Nicholson, with whom he made Five Easy Pieces and The King of Marvin Gardens in the 1970s.

Plot
Alex Gates is a Miami wine merchant who has distanced himself from his alcoholic wife Suzanne with his philandering, and from his stepson Jason with his indifference.

Heavily in debt, Alex hatches a plan to steal a valuable diamond necklace from the house of his clients, the Reese family, where his Cuban mistress Gabriela works. He cases the house during a wine delivery with Jason, who works in Alex's business. Jason becomes attracted to Gabriela, unaware of her relationship with his stepfather.

On the day of the heist, Alex and his partner Victor, a British safe-cracker, arrive at the house under the pretense that the Reeses' wine cellar needs repairs. Gabriela was supposed to let them in, but she was fired the day before. Fortunately, Alex had cultivated a relationship with the security guard and is able to convince him to let them inside. Victor sends Alex and the guard off on an errand while he works on the safe, but a second guard becomes suspicious, although Victor is able to complete the job before being discovered.

The pair decide that Alex will pawn the necklace in New York City, and he invites Gabriela to go with him. As he is packing, Suzanne happens upon his airline tickets and immediately realizes he is having another affair. The two get into a physical altercation and Suzanne knocks him out with a fire poker. Panicking, Suzanne empties out his suitcase, where he has hidden the necklace, and uses it for her own clothing. She and Jason flee to the Florida Keys. Upon arriving, they discover the necklace, but Suzanne doesn't want to keep it. Jason has it appraised and discovers it is worth $1 million. He also visits Gabriela back in Miami, giving her the phone number of the place where they are staying.

Victor and Alex visit Jason's friend Henry in an attempt to learn Jason's whereabouts. Victor, who is dying of tuberculosis and determined to profit from the heist, assaults Henry before Alex realizes he doesn't know anything. The pair contact various jewelers to be on the lookout for the necklace and get a report from Jason's appraiser. Arriving in Key Largo, Victor pretends to flirt with Suzanne, but Jason, who has gotten a description of Henry's assailant, realizes who he is. After a fight, Jason flees with his mother in their car. Victor and Alex give chase and cause an accident that kills Suzanne. Although injured, Jason discharges himself from the hospital and returns to Miami to kill his stepfather, only to find Gabriela in Alex's bed. After a brief argument, the two reconcile.

Alex discovers Jason and Gabriela the next morning, and accuses her of sleeping with his stepson. Victor confronts Jason, who tricks him into thinking that he has returned the necklace to Alex. Victor goes to Alex's house and attacks him before collapsing from exhaustion, whereupon Alex smothers Victor with a pillow. That night, Jason shows the necklace to Gabriela. The next day, she calls Alex and they search Jason's boat, but Jason, anticipating this, confronts them and he and Alex fight.

Eventually, Jason crushes Alex between the boat and the dock, severely injuring him, before fleeing the scene. Gabriela, who had fled with the necklace, returns and leaves it with Alex, insisting that she doesn't want it, but pilfers one of the diamonds before she leaves. With an ambulance and the police on the way, a defeated Alex realizes he has no choice but to dispose of the necklace and throws it into the ocean.

Cast
 Jack Nicholson as Alex Gates
 Stephen Dorff as Jason
 Jennifer Lopez as Gabriela
 Judy Davis as Suzanne Gates
 Michael Caine as Victor Spansky
 Harold Perrineau Jr. as Henry
 Robyn Peterson as Dina Reese
 Mike Starr as Mike
 John Seitz as Frank Reese
 Marc Macaulay as Guard
 Dan Daily as Todd
 Marta Velasco as Gabriela's Cousin

Production
British producer Jeremy Thomas was attracted to work with Rafelson due to what he perceived as the director's European sensibilities. He later remembered:

Blood and Wine was shot in Miami, South Florida and the Florida Keys, including some scenes at the Caribbean Club in Key Largo. Alex's family home is located in the Coral Gables/Pinecrest area. Gabriela is shown to live in Little Havana. The Reeses live in Millionaire's Row in Miami Beach. Their house is next to Indian Creek and has a view of Collins Avenue. Jason's fishing boat is anchored in the Miami River, near Downtown Miami. Before the dance scene between Alex and Gabriela, we see a view of Southeast Financial Center in Downtown Miami.

Reception
Rotten Tomatoes, a review aggregator, reports that 61% of 31 surveyed critics gave the film a positive review; the average rating is 6.1/10.  David Rooney of Variety called it "an amusingly caustic, straight-up serving of film noir staples spiced with star charisma".  Film critic Roger Ebert wrote, "Blood & Wine is a richly textured crime picture based on the personalities of men who make their living desperately. Jack Nicholson and Michael Caine are the stars, as partners in a jewel theft that goes wrong in a number of ways, each way illustrating deep flaws in how they choose to live."  Edward Guthmann of the San Francisco Chronicle rated it 2/4 stars and wrote, "Blood & Wine has elements of classic film noir – but it's film noir with a sledgehammer and none of the genre's suggestiveness or style."

Caine won Best Actor at the San Sebastian International Film Festival.

References

External links

 
 
 
 
 
 

1996 films
1996 crime thriller films
American crime thriller films
American heist films
1990s English-language films
Films set in Miami
Fox Searchlight Pictures films
American neo-noir films
Films directed by Bob Rafelson
Films produced by Jeremy Thomas
Films scored by Michał Lorenc
1990s heist films
Films set in Coral Gables, Florida
Films shot in Miami
1990s American films